Harold Edward Achor (November 16, 1907 – February 5, 1967) was an American lawyer, politician, and judge who served as a justice of the Indiana Supreme Court from January 3, 1955 to December 12, 1966.

Biography

Early life, education, and career
Achor was born in Coffeyville, Kansas. When Achor was an infant, his family moved to Kosciusko County, Indiana. Achor attended public school in Atwood.

Achor attended the University of Indianapolis (then known as Indiana Central College), graduating in 1928. He received his legal education at Indiana University Maurer School of Law (in Bloomington), graduating in 1931, and moved to Anderson that year to begin practicing law, founding the firm of Achor & Peck with his former classmate at IU, William L. Peck.

From 1932 to 1937, Achor taught public speaking and political science at Anderson University (then known as Anderson College). He was also a member of the Anderson College Board of Trustees and the Board of Governors of the Associated Colleges of Indiana. He was also appointed to the Committee of One Hundred of the International Council of Religious Education and helped to organize a branch of Alcoholics Anonymous in Muncie. He additionally served in many other local civic and religious organizations in Anderson.

Achor was involved with the Anderson Church of God and helped to organize the Anderson Area Inter-Faith Fellowship, "an annual gathering of pacifists concerned about eliminating racial prejudice and discrimination" which included Protestants, Catholics, and Jews.

Judicial service
In 1942, Achor, a Republican, was elected judge of the Madison County Superior Court. During this time, he also worked as a marriage counselor. In 1950, he was elected judge of the Indiana Appellate Court, serving in the position for a single four-year term.

In 1955, Achor became a justice of the Indiana Supreme Court, succeeding Justice Dan Flanagan. He resigned from the bench in 1966 due to his failing health. He was succeeded to the court by Justice Donald Hunter.

Personal life and death
In 1935, Achor married Helen Shoemaker in Anderson. Shoemaker was originally from Tomball, Texas. Achor died in 1967, in Anderson.

References

1907 births
1967 deaths
People from Coffeyville, Kansas
University of Indianapolis alumni
Indiana University Maurer School of Law alumni
Justices of the Indiana Supreme Court
American judges
Indiana Republicans
Members of the Church of God (Anderson, Indiana)